Bangladesh Export Import Company Limited (Bangla Transliteration: বাংলাদেশ এক্সপোর্ট ইমপোর্ট কোম্পানি লিমিটেড, romanised: Bānglādēsh ēkspōrṭ impōrṭ kōmpāni limiṭēḍ), commonly known by its trade name BEXIMCO (Bangla: বেক্সিমকো) (DSE: BEXIMCO CSE: BEXIMCO), is a Bangladeshi multinational conglomerate holding company, headquartered in Dhaka, Bangladesh. It was founded in the early 1970s. Beximco is Bangladesh's largest conglomerate, with the largest market capitalisation on the country's stock market. BEXIMCO's subsidiaries export products to 55 countries worldwide. It has retail outlets in South Asia and Eastern Europe.

Beximco operates one of the largest integrated textile production businesses in Asia. Its main manufacturing base is the Beximco Industrial Park in Gazipur, Bangladesh. Beximco Pharma, the group's pharmaceutical producer, was the first Bangladeshi company to be listed on the London Stock Exchange.

History
The company was founded by brothers A. S. F. Rahman and Salman F Rahman in 1972, right after the independence of Bangladesh. Their family was earlier engaged in the jute business. The jute factory was nationalized in the early 1970s. However, with free market reforms in the late 1970s and 1980s, the family regained many of their businesses.

Since the early 1970s, Beximco has been a pioneer in industrial and business sectors. Currently it has operations and investments across a wide range of industries including pharmaceuticals, ceramics, renewable energy, textiles, LPG,  food & beverage, satellite to home television, PPE, media, ICT,  real estate, financial services, and travel & tourism.

In 2005, Beximco Pharma became the first Bangladeshi company to be listed on the Alternative Investment Market of the London Stock Exchange. Beximco also opened its first overseas retail outlet with the launch of the Yellow clothing brand in Karachi, Pakistan. Yellow has since expanded to several Bangladeshi and Pakistani cities. In 2009, Shinepukur Ceramics opened a showroom in Moscow, Russia. In 2010, the company acquired stakes in several major Bangladeshi businesses, including IFIC Bank, GMG Airlines, and Unique Hotels and Resorts.

Beximco Communications, a joint venture of Beximco Holdings with Russian company GS Group, launched Bangladesh's first direct-to-home (DTH) satellite television service in 2016, under the brand name RealVU. RealVU later suspended operations, but was rebooted as Akash in 2019. As of 2022, Akash had 700,000 subscribers and growing.

The company is considered to enjoy close connections with the Awami League, with its vice chairman Salman F Rahman serving as a Private Sector Development Affairs Adviser to Prime Minister and Bangladesh Awami League President Sheikh Hasina, the current Prime Minister of Bangladesh, in the past and as Private Sector Industry and Investment Adviser at the moment.

Recently Beximco with other companies donated 6.93cr to Labour Welfare Fund support to workers in the formal and informal sectors for accidental deaths, treatment of injuries, incurable diseases, and also for the higher education of their children.

Key officials

 A. S. F. Rahman, Chairman
 Salman F Rahman, Vice-chairman
 Shayan F Rahman, Advisors to the Board
 Shahryar Rahman, Advisors to the Board
 Iqbal Ahmed, Group Director
 ABS Rahman, Group Director
 O K Chawdhury, Group Director and CEO (Power & Engineering)
 Nazmul Hasan Papon, Group Director and CEO (Pharmaceuticals)
 Syed Naved Hussain, Group Director and CEO (Textiles)
 Sami Wadood, Group Director 
 Ajmal Kabir, Group Director
 Humayun Kabir FCA, CEO (Ceramics)
 M Shamsur Rahman, CEO (Media)
 Shah A Sarwar, Managing Director and CEO (IFIC Bank)
 Mrinal Roy, CEO (Petroleum)
 M Asad Ullah FCS, Executive Director & Company Secretary

Products
 Aviation
 Banking - IFIC Bank
 Ceramic
 Construction
 DTH
 Electric Power Generation
 Fashion
 Fisheries
 Food & beverage
 Information Technology
 Hotels
 Media
 Petroleum Products
 Pharmaceuticals
 PPE
 Private Satellite Television Channel
 Sports Team & Franchise
 Travel & tourism
 Textiles
 Real Estate
 Renewable energy

Subsidiaries 
The conglomerate compromises four public traded and eight privately held companies.
 Bangladesh Export Import Co. Ltd. (public)
 Beximco Pharma (public)
 Beximco Computers Ltd.
 Beximco Engineering Ltd.
 Beximco Aviation Limited
 Beximco Petroleum Ltd.
 Beximco Power Company Ltd.
 Beximco Synthetics Ltd. (public)
 Giga Tech Ltd.
 Independent Television
 Shinepukur Ceramics (public)
 Yellow
 IFIC Bank
 BEXTRADE
 Dhaka Dynamites (BPL Team)

Akash DTH

Akash DTH, formally incorporated as RealVU DTH, is the sole direct broadcast satellite television provider to households in Bangladesh, operated by Beximco Communications Limited, and owned by parent company BEXIMCO.  It broadcasts multichannel TV services via satellite Bangabandhu-1. It also offers Personal Video Recording (PVR) capabilities, and HD support.

History
In 2014, Bangladesh government gave license to operate digital service to RealVu(Now Akash DTH) and Bengal Digital.

RealVU DTH began broadcasting in 2016 on ABS-2 at 75 degrees east as a joint venture with GS group. The owner of the provider is BEXIMCO via Beximco Communications Limited. The early years of the company were unstable due to technical and financial difficulties. RealVU DTH failed to capture the market, and postponed it services within a years.

In 2017, GS group sold their share in Beximco Communications(holding company of RealVu and now Akash) but continued providing hardware and software for the service.

In 2019, they came back with a rebranded name Akash DTH.

From 2019, Akash DTH has been providing television services to customers using Bangladeshi satellite Bangabandhu-1. The company broadcasts more than 120 television stations from around the world, along with exclusive Bangladeshi channels. In 2021, Akash DTH started offering its customers the first PVR in Bangladesh.

Financial situation 
The company got a fee waiver of ৳111.56M due to losses from May 2019 to 2020. But a spectrum charge waiver over the next five years was denied.

Marketing 
Customers of analog cable system were switching to digital cable system such as Bengal Digital, Jadoo Digital and DTH system such as Akash DTH for its superior picture quality. While the market penetration remained low, the market share of Akash DTH was growing. Akash DTH used multiple types of marketing such as TV marketing, guerilla marketing, word of mouth and viral marketing.

See also
 Dhaka Dynamites
 Shinepukur Cricket Club
 List of companies of Bangladesh

References

External links 

BEXIMCO group
Manufacturing companies based in Dhaka
Mass media companies of Bangladesh
Pharmaceutical companies of Bangladesh
Conglomerate companies of Bangladesh
Companies listed on the Chittagong Stock Exchange
Manufacturing companies established in 1972